The Burlington County Scholastic League (BCSL)  is a New Jersey high school sports conference under the jurisdiction of the New Jersey State Interscholastic Athletic Association (NJSIAA). The league consists of nineteen public and parochial high schools covering Burlington County (Doane Academy), Mercer County (Trenton Catholic Academy, and STEMCivics Purplefect Palace High School), Ocean County (New Egypt High School) in central New Jersey and Camden County (Pennsauken High School). All schools that sponsor a football program are members of the West Jersey Football League.

Member schools

External links
Burlington County Scholastic League website
New Jersey State Interscholastic Athletic Association website

New Jersey high school athletic conferences